Haute-Sanaga is a department of Central Region in Cameroon.
The department covers an area of 11,854 km and as of 2001 had a total population of 115,305. The capital of the department lies at Nanga-Eboko.

Subdivisions
The department is divided administratively into seven communes and in turn into villages.

Communes 
 Bibey
 Lembe-Yezoum
 Mbandjock
 Minta
 Nanga-Eboko
 Nkoteng
 Nsem

References

Departments of Cameroon
Centre Region (Cameroon)